United States competed at the 1992 Winter Paralympics in Tignes/Albertville, France. 29 competitors from United States won 45 medals including 20 gold, 16 silver and 9 bronze and finished 1st in the medal table.

See also 
 United States at the Paralympics
 United States at the 1992 Winter Olympics

References 

1992
1992 in American sports
Nations at the 1992 Winter Paralympics